Gary Michael Jeter (January 24, 1955 – March 9, 2016) was a professional American football defensive end in the National Football League (NFL).  An All-American at the University of Southern California in 1976, Jeter was drafted by the New York Giants in the first round (fifth overall) in the 1977 NFL Draft.

College career

After his graduation from Cathedral Latin School, Cleveland, Ohio, Jeter started every game at Defensive end for USC from his 3rd game in 1974 until his final game in the Rose Bowl in 1977 and was a member of 1974 National Championship team. In 1976 First-team All-American  and while at USC he started in three Rose Bowls (1974, 1975, and 1977). He was a three-time All-Conference First-team (1974, 1975, 1976) and won USC's Defensive Player of the Year Award in 1975.

Professional career
Jeter played in 13 NFL seasons from 1977 to 1989 for the New York Giants, Los Angeles Rams and New England Patriots. During his professional career, he amassed 79 sacks. He was a starter with the Giants through the 1981 season and was a back-up in 1982. As a rookie in 1977 he was an All-Rookie selection and recorded 3 sacks, a number he matched in 1978. In 1979, he had 4 sacks. In 1980, he led the Giants with 10 sacks and was an alternate to the Pro Bowl. In 1981, he had 7 sacks as the resurgent Giants defense led by Lawrence Taylor, made the play-offs for the first time in Jeter's career. In 1982, slowed by a left-knee injury and by the player's strike, Jeter played only four games and did not record a sack.

On April 9, 1983, he was traded to the Los Angeles Rams. Jeter spent the 1983 season as a backup and as a designated pass rusher——who came in to rush the quarterback on likely passing downs. He recorded  sacks in that role. In 1984 Jeter had back trouble and missed most of the season.

In 1985, he came back healthy and resumed the "designated" role for the Rams totaling 11 sacks, which again was second on the team. He was voted Comeback Player of the Year after the 1985 season. In 1986 (8 sacks), 1987 (7 sacks) and 1988 Jeter performed exceptionally well in his role, getting a career-high  sacks in 1988, including 5 in one game against the Los Angeles Raiders on September 18, 1988, for which he was awarded the NFC Player of the Week.

After the 1988 season the Rams left Jeter an unprotected "Plan B" free agent and the New England Patriots signed him to do the same job he'd been doing in Los Angeles—to come off the bench on third down and rush the quarterback. He ended the 1989 season with 7 sacks. Jeter was released by the Patriots August 29, 1990. The Los Angeles Rams agreed to terms with him, however, he failed the team physical due to a chronic back problem.

Personal life and death
Jeter resided in Plainsboro, New Jersey. He was the manager of Business Development for Motivated Security Services in Somerville, New Jersey, a certified WBENC Company.

Jeter died on March 9, 2016, at the age of 61 of an apparent heart attack. He was survived by his wife Leslie, and four daughters − Ayisha, Denyse, Kayla, and Breana. Kayla was a standout volleyball player, earning All-American honors at the University of Tennessee. Upon graduation Kayla earned her master's degree and played two years of professional volleyball in Helsinki, Finland. She is currently the assistant volleyball coach at the University of Cincinnati. Another daughter, Breana, attends the University of Tennessee.

References

1955 births
2016 deaths
People from Weirton, West Virginia
All-American college football players
American football defensive tackles
American football defensive ends
USC Trojans football players
New York Giants players
Los Angeles Rams players
New England Patriots players